Pilot Rock is a city in Umatilla County, Oregon, United States. The population was 1,502 at the 2010 census. It is part of the Pendleton–Hermiston Micropolitan Statistical Area. The main industries are timber and agriculture. Pilot Rock is home to the Boise Cascade /Kinzua Lumber lumber and pole mill as well as Pilot Rock High School. The name of Pilot Rock refers to a large basalt rock formation which is visible from the old Oregon Trail and was used in navigating wagon trains through the area.

Geography

Climate
According to the Köppen Climate Classification system, Pilot Rock has a steppe climate, abbreviated BSk on climate maps.

Demographics

2010 census
As of the census of 2010, there were 1,502 people, 582 households, and 416 families residing in the city. The racial makeup of the city was 93.5% White, 1.7% Native American, 1.0% from other races, and 3.7% from two or more races. Hispanic or Latino of any race were 3.2% of the population.

There were 582 households, of which 34.2% had children under the age of 18 living with them, 53.4% were married couples living together, 11.9% had a female householder with no husband present, 6.2% had a male householder with no wife present, and 28.5% were non-families. 22.9% of all households were made up of individuals, and 11.4% had someone living alone who was 65 years of age or older. The average household size was 2.58 and the average family size was 2.99.

The median age in the city was 37.9 years. 27% of residents were under the age of 18; 8.8% were between the ages of 18 and 24; 21.9% were from 25 to 44; 25.6% were from 45 to 64; and 16.8% were 65 years of age or older. The gender makeup of the city was 48.7% male and 51.3% female.

2000 census
As of the census of 2000, there were 1,532 people, 590 households, and 454 families residing in the city. The population density was 1,968.6 people per square mile (758.3/km). There were 630 housing units at an average density of 809.5 per square mile (311.9/km). The racial makeup of the city was 94.13% White, 0.26% African American, 2.68% Native American, 0.26% Asian, 0.65% from other races, and 2.02% from two or more races. Hispanic or Latino of any race were 1.50% of the population.

There were 590 households, out of which 35.4% had children under the age of 18 living with them, 62.4% were married couples living together, 10.3% had a female householder with no husband present, and 22.9% were non-families. 20.0% of all households were made up of individuals, and 7.8% had someone living alone who was 65 years of age or older. The average household size was 2.60 and the average family size was 2.94.

In the city, the population was spread out, with 27.9% under the age of 18, 7.0% from 18 to 24, 28.6% from 25 to 44, 21.7% from 45 to 64, and 14.9% who were 65 years of age or older. The median age was 37 years. For every 100 females, there were 94.9 males. For every 100 females age 18 and over, there were 97.0 males.

The median income for a household in the city was $34,766, and the median income for a family was $40,134. Males had a median income of $31,364 versus $19,792 for females. The per capita income for the city was $15,666. About 6.4% of families and 9.0% of the population were below the poverty line, including 9.8% of those under age 18 and 6.9% of those age 65 or over.

References

External links
 Entry for Pilot Rock in the Oregon Blue Book

Cities in Oregon
Cities in Umatilla County, Oregon
Pendleton–Hermiston Micropolitan Statistical Area
1911 establishments in Oregon